South Bend Brewing Association is a historic brewery complex located at South Bend, St. Joseph County, Indiana.  The main plant was built in 1905, and is a large, irregularly shaped brick building with a four-story section.  It features square corner towers and a crenellated parapet. A one-story, glass paneled storefront was added in the 1950s. A separate bottling works building was constructed in 1910.

It was listed on the National Register of Historic Places in 2001.

References

Industrial buildings and structures on the National Register of Historic Places in Indiana
Industrial buildings completed in 1905
Buildings and structures in South Bend, Indiana
National Register of Historic Places in St. Joseph County, Indiana
1905 establishments in Indiana